The Newton Kansan is an American daily newspaper published six days per week (excluding major holidays) in Newton, Kansas. It is owned by Gannett.

The paper covers Harvey County, including the cities of Newton, Burrton, Halstead, Hesston, North Newton and Sedgwick.

The paper was founded as a weekly in 1872 and converted to a daily circulation in 1886. In 1952, it changed its name from The Evening Kansan-Republican to The Newton Kansan. The newspaper's electronic version began in 1996.

Stauffer Communications bought the newspaper in 1953. Morris Communications bought Stauffer in 1994, and sold the Kansan to GateHouse Media in October 2007.

The Newton Kansan is one of several newspapers Gannett owns in the Wichita metropolitan area, including the dailies The Butler County Times-Gazette and Wellington Daily News.

See also
 List of newspapers in Kansas

References

External links
 

Newspapers published in Kansas
Harvey County, Kansas
Mass media in Wichita, Kansas
Publications established in 1872
1872 establishments in Kansas
Gannett publications